The Kampalili shrew-mouse or the Kampalili baletemys (Baletemys kampalili) is a species of rodent in the family Muridae. It is the only species in the genus Baletemys. It is found only on Mount Kampalili, in the highlands of eastern Mindanao, in the Philippines.

References

Rodents of the Philippines
Muridae
Monotypic vertebrate genera
Monotypic rodent genera
Taxobox binomials not recognized by IUCN